Parliamentary elections were held in Nauru on 9 December 1989, after the resignation of President Hammer DeRoburt following a vote of no-confidence in August and the subsequent resignation of his replacement, Kenas Aroi, for health reasons. Following the election Bernard Dowiyogo was elected President by the Parliament, defeating DeRoburt. Voter turnout was 88.7%.

Results

References

Nauru
1989 in Nauru
Elections in Nauru
Non-partisan elections
Election and referendum articles with incomplete results